Adergoudounbadēs (before 488 – 541), was a prominent Sasanian nobleman, general, and kanarang during the reigns of Kavadh I (r. 488–531) and Khosrow I (r. 531–579). His life is known only through the work of the Byzantine historian Procopius. His native name was probably Adurgundbad (in New ), an abbreviation of Adurgushnaspbad. Pourshariati records the native name as Ādhargulbād.

Biography
Adhurgunbadh first appears in 488. A young man at the time, according to Procopius, he already had a reputation as a soldier. In that year, he helped Kavadh I rise to the throne against his uncle Balash. As a reward, Kavadh raised Adergoudounbades to the important post of kanarang, governor of the northeastern province of Abarshahr which adjoined Hephthalite territory, replacing his relative, Gushnaspdad (Gousanastades), who was executed.

Little is known of Adergoudounbades during the subsequent decades, save that he had considerable success as a general: Procopius reports that he subdued twelve barbarian tribes to Persian rule. He participated in the Anastasian War, being involved in the Siege of Amida (502–503).

When Khosrow I ascended the throne in 531, a conspiracy was formed by Bawi and other nobles who wanted to overthrow him and elevate his nephew Kavadh, the son of Kavadh I's second eldest son Jamasp (Greek Zames)—who could not himself claim the throne as he was blind in one eye—to the throne. The conspiracy was discovered and suppressed, but Kavadh, who was still a child, was away from the court, being raised by Adergoudounbades. Khosrau sent orders to kill Kavadh, but Adergoudounbades disobeyed and brought him up in secret, until he was betrayed to the shah in 541 by his own son, Bahram (Varrames). Khosrow had him executed, but Kavadh, or someone claiming to be him, managed to flee to the Byzantine Empire.

References

Citations

Works cited 

 
 
 
 

5th-century births
541 deaths
5th-century Iranian people
6th-century Iranian people
Executed military personnel
People of the Roman–Sasanian Wars
Kanarang
People executed by the Sasanian Empire
Generals of Khosrow I
Anastasian War
Generals of Kavad I